Platinum Suites Bangladesh is a seven-floor boutique hotel located in Banani, Bangladesh. The first two floors comprise the hotel entrance, lobby and two dining facilities. There are 6 rooms on each floor. The hotel was developed by Sheltech (Pvt) Ltd., a Bangladeshi real estate developer.

Overview

The hotel has 12 large suites, 5 studio suites, 4 theme suites and 3 regular suites, for a total of 24 suites. The hotel has three dining facilities: Cafe Nemo, Terra Bistro, and Platinum Terrace.

References

Hotels in Dhaka